Octávio Sérgio da Costa Moraes (9 July 1923 – 19 October 2009) was a Brazilian footballer. He played in four matches for the Brazil national football team in 1949. He was also part of Brazil's squad for the 1949 South American Championship.

References

External links
 

1923 births
2009 deaths
Brazilian footballers
Brazil international footballers
Place of birth missing
Association footballers not categorized by position